Christ Jyoti Convent High School is a school in Chiplun, Maharashtra, India. It is managed by the Sisters of Our Lady of Fatima,  founded by Msgr. Francis Xavier Kroot, MHM, on 8 February 1893 at Bellary in Karnataka. The school motto is ' Let Your Light Shine'. The school is recognized by the State Government of Maharashtra. It was established in 1984 and had its silver jubilee celebration in the year 2010.  It is one of the biggest schools in Chiplun.

The school's sports teams, particularly their football team, perform well and win trophies in the inter-school sports competitions conducted in Chiplun. The school is also well known for their kabaddi team and cricket team.

The high school has an average of 1300 students on its roster, from Standards V to X. The school is located in Walope, with a church located on the summit of this hill. Being a rather picturesque location, the school has featured in movies. It has three huge grounds which are used for conducting sports or programmes like Annual Day.

Education 

The school follows the SSC board which is the state board of the Government of Maharashtra. It runs classes from standard one to standard ten. The primary (Standard one to four) and secondary school occupy different buildings. A class has three sections from 'A' to 'C' with approximately sixty students each.
All students of the school belong to one of four houses - Blue, Yellow, Red, Green. Each house has an elected House Captain and a Vice-Captain from standard nine. Additionally a School Head Boy and Head Girl are elected from standard ten. These student representatives maintain student discipline and lead student and ceremonial activities.
It is one of the few schools in Chiplun to have a large football field, basketball court, a paved covered activity hall and an assembly quadrangle.

Catholic secondary schools in India
Christian schools in Maharashtra
High schools and secondary schools in Maharashtra
Ratnagiri district